The 28th Saturn Awards, honoring the best in science fiction, fantasy and horror film and television in 2001, were held on June 10, 2002 at the St. Regis Hotel in Century City, Los Angeles. This year introduced categories that honored DVD releases onward. The nominations were announced on March 13, 2002.

Below is a complete list of nominees and winners. Winners are highlighted in bold.

Winners and nominees

Film

Television

Programs

Acting

DVD

Special awards

Cinescape Genre Face of the Future Award

The Young Filmmaker's Showcase Award
 Richard Kelly – Donnie Darko

The George Pal Memorial Award
 Samuel Z. Arkoff (posthumous)

The Special Achievement Award
 Anchor Bay Entertainment

The Dr. Donald A. Reed Award
 Sherry Lansing

The Life Career Award
 Stan Lee
 Drew Struzan

References

External links
 2002 Awards at IMDb
 The Official Saturn Awards Site

Saturn Awards ceremonies
2002 film awards
2002 in California
2002 television awards